Guaza de Campos is a municipality located in the province of Palencia, Castile and León, Spain. 
It is in the plain known as the  Tierra de Campos.

According to the 2004 census (INE), the municipality had a population of 68 inhabitants.

References

Municipalities in the Province of Palencia